is a Japanese former football player who last played for Kagoshima United FC.

Career
Nishioka was released by Kagoshima United at the end of the 2019 season. He later retired and was appointed as head coach of Kagoshima United's U-15 academy team.

Career statistics
Updated to 10 January 2020.

References

External links
Profile at Kagoshima United FC

1987 births
Living people
Kansai University alumni
Association football people from Ehime Prefecture
Japanese footballers
J2 League players
J3 League players
Mito HollyHock players
Kagoshima United FC players
Japanese expatriate footballers
Expatriate footballers in Thailand
Japanese expatriate sportspeople in Thailand
Association football midfielders